The communes of Cambodia ( khum/ sangkat) are the third-level administrative divisions in  Cambodia. They are the subdivisions of the districts and municipalities of Cambodia. Communes can consist of as few as 3 or as many as 30 villages (phum), depending on the population.

 In 1998 there were a total of 1,609 communes, and 13,406 villages in Cambodia.
 However, according to the 2008 census there are now 1,621 communes in Cambodia and 14,073 villages.
 As of the 2017 commune elections, the number of communes had risen to 1,646.

Banteay Meanchey Province

Mongkol Borei District
 *Banteay Neang
 *Bat Trang
 *Chamnaom
 *Kouk Ballangk
 *Koy Maeng
 *Ou Prasat
 *Phnum Touch
 *Rohat Tuek
 *Ruessei Kraok
 *Sambuor
 *Soea
 *Srah Reang
 *Ta Lam

Phnum Srok District
Nam Tau
Paoy Char
Phnom Dei
Ponley
Spean Sraeng Rouk
Srah Chik

Preah Netr Preah District
Bos Sbov
Chhnuor
Chob
Phnum Lieb
Prasat Char
Preah Netr Preah
Rohal Rohal
Tean Kam
Tuek Chour Smach

Ou Chrov District
Changha
Koub
Kuttasat
Ou Bei Choan
Samraong
Soengh
Souphi

Serei Saophoan District
Kampong Svay
Kaoh Pong Satv
Mkak
Ou Ambel
Phniet
Preah Ponlea
Tuek Thla

Thma Puok District
Banteay Chhmar
Kouk Kakthen
Kouk Romiet
Kumru
Phum Thmei
Thma Puok

Svay Chek District
Phkoam
Roluos
Sarongk
Sla Kram
Svay Chek
Ta Baen
Ta Phou
Treas

Malai District
Boeng Beng
Malai
Ou Sampor
Ou Sralau
Ta Kong
Tuol Pongro

Poipet Municipality
Nimitt
Poipet
Phsar Kandal

Battambang Province

Banan District
Kantueu Muoy
Kantueu Pir
Bay Damram
Chheu Teal
Chaeng Mean Chey
Phnum Sampov
Snoeng
Ta Kream

Thma Koul District
Ta Pung
Ta Meun
Ou Ta Ki
Chrey
Anlong Run
Chrouy Sdau
Boeng Pring
Kouk Khmum
Bansay Traeng
Rung Chrey

Battambang District
Tuol Ta Aek
Preaek Preah Sdach
Rottanak
Chamkar Samraong
Sla Kaet
Kdol Doun Teav
Ou Mal
Voat Kor
Ou Char
Svay Pao

Bavel District
Bavel
Khnach Romeas
Prey Khpos
Ampil Pram Daeum
Kdol Tahen
Boeng Pram
Khleang meas

Aek Phnum District
Preaek Norint
Samraong Knong
Preaek Khpob
Preaek Luong
Peam Aek
Prey Chas
Kaoh Chiveang Thvang

Moung Ruessei District
Moung
Kear
Prey Svay
Ruessei Krang
Chrey
Ta Loas
Kakaoh
Prey Touch
Robas Mongkol

Rukhak Kiri District
Prek Chik
Prey Tralach
Basak
Mukh Rea
Sdok Pravoek

Rotanak Mondol District
Sdau
Andaeuk Haeb
Phlov Meas
Traeng
Reaksmey Sangha

Sangkae District
Anlong Vil
Norea
Ta Pon
Roka
Kampong Preah
Kampong Prieng
Reang Kesei
Ou Dambang Muoy
Ou Dambang Pir
Voat Ta Muem

Samlout District
Ta Taok
Kampong Lpov
Ou Samrel
Sung
Samlout
Mean Chey
Ta Sanh

Sampov Loun District
Sampov Lun
Angkor Ban
Ta Sda
Santepheap
Serei Mean Chey
Chrey Seima

Phnum Proek District
Phnum Proek
Pech Chenda
Bour
Barang Thleak
Ou Rumduol

Kamrieng District
Kamrieng
Boeng Reang
Ou Da
Trang
Ta Saen
Ta Krai

Koh Kralor District
Thipakdei
Koh Kralor
Hab
Preah Phos
Doun Ba
Chhnal Moan

Kampong Cham Province

Batheay District
Batheay
Chbar Ampov
Chealea
Cheung Prey
Me Pring
Ph'av
Sambour
Sandaek
Tang Krang
Prasat
Tang Krasang
Trab Roung
Tumnob

Chamkar Leu District
Bos Khnaor
Chamkar Andoung
Cheyyou
Lvea Leu
Spueu
Svay Teab
Ta Ong
Ta Prok

Cheung Prey District
Khnaor Dambang
Kouk Rovieng
Phdau Chum
Prey Char
Pring Chrum
Sampong Chey
Sdaeung Chey
Soutip
Srama
Trapeang Kor

Kampong Cham Municipality
Boeng Kok
Kampong Cham
Sambuor Meas
Veal Vong

Kampong Siem District
Ampil
Hann Chey
Kien Chrey
Kokor
Kaoh Mitt
Kaoh Roka
Kaoh Samraong
Kaoh Tontuem
Krala
Ou Svay
Ro'ang
Rumchek
Srak
Trean
Vihear Thum

Kang Meas District
Angkor Ban
Kong Taneung
Khchau
Peam Chikong
Prek Koy
Prek Krabau
Reay Pay
Roka'a
Roka'koy
Sdau
Sor Korng

Koh Sotin District
Kampong Reab
Koh Sotin
Tve
Mohaleap
Moha Knhoung
Peam Brothnous
Pongro
Prek Tanung

Prey Chhor District
Baray
Beung Nay
Chrey Vean
Mean
Trapeang Preah
Khvet Thum
Kor
Krouch
Lvea
Prey Chor
Sor Sen
Somrorng
Sragnae
Thma Poun
Tong Rong

Srey Santhor District
Baray
Chibal
Khnar Sor
Koh Andet
Mean Chey
Phteas Kandal
Bram Yam
Prek Dombok
Prek Por
Prek Romdeng
Russey Srok
Svay Por
Svay Ksach Phnom
Torng Trolach

Stueng Trang District
Areak Tnort
Dorng Kdar
Kpob Tangoun
Mesar Chrey
Or Mlou
Peam Koh Sna
Preah Andong
Prek Kork
Sopheas
Toul Preahkhleang
Toul Sombor

Kampong Chhnang Province

Baribour District
Anhchanh Rung
Chhnok Tru
Chak
Khon Rang
Kampong Preah Kokir
Melum
Phsar
Pech Changvar
Popel
Ponley
Trapeang Chan

Chol Kiri District
Chol Sar
Kaoh Thkov
Kampong Os
Peam Chhkaok
Prey Kri

Kampong Chhnang Municipality
Phsar Chhnang
Kampong Chhnang
Ph'er
Khsam

Kampong Leaeng District
Chranouk
Dar
Kampong Hau
Phlov Tuk
Pou
Pralay Meas
Samraong Saen
Svay Rumpear
Trangel

Kampong Tralach District
Ampil Tuek
Chhuk Sa
Chres
Kampong Tralach
Longveaek
Ou Ruessei
Peani
Saeb
Ta Ches
Thma Edth

Rolea B'ier District
Andoung Snay
Banteay Preal
Cheung Kreav
Chrey Bak
Kouk Banteay
Krang Leav
Pongro
Prasneb
Prey Mul
Rolea B'ier
Srae Thmei
Svay Chrum
Tuek Hout

Sameakki Mean Chey District
Chhean Laeung
Khnar Chhmar
Krang Lvea
Peam
Sedthei
Svay
Svay Chuk
Tbaeng Khpos
Thlok Vien

Tuek Phos District
Akphivoadth
Chieb
Chaong Maong
Kbal Tuek
Khlong Popok
Krang Skear
Tang Krasang
Toul Khpos

Kampong Speu Province

Basedth District
Basedth
Kat Phluk
Nitean
Pheakdei
Pheari Mean Chey
Phong
Pou Angkrang
Pou Chamraeun
Pou Mreal
Svay Chacheb
Tuol Ampil
Tuol Sala
Kak
Svay Rumpea
Preah Khae

Chbar Mon District
Chbar Mon
Kandaol Dom
Roka Thum
Sopoar Tep
Svay Kravan

Kong Pisey
Ang Popel
Chongruk
Moha Ruessei
Pechr Muni
Preah Nipean
Prey Nheat
Prey Vihear
Roka Kaoh
Sdok
Snam Krapeu
Srang
Tuek L'ak
Veal

Aoral District
Haong Samnam
Reaksmei Sameakki
Trapeang Chour
Sangkae Satob
Ta Sal

Odong District
Chant Saen
Cheung Roas
Chumpu Proeks
Khsem Khsan
Krang Chek
Mean Chey
Prey Krasang
Trach Tong
Veal Pung
Veang Chas
Yutth Sameakki
Damnak Reang
Peang Lvea
Phnum Touch

Phnom Sruoch District
Chambak
Choam Sangkae
Dambouk Rung
Kiri Voan
Krang Dei Vay
Moha Sang
Ou
Prey Rumduol
Prey Kmeng
Tang Samraong
Tang Sya
Traeng Trayueng

Samraong Tong District
Roleang Chak
Kahaeng
Khtum Krang
Krang Ampil
Pneay
Roleang Kreul
Samraong Tong
Sambour
Saen Dei
Skuh
Tang Krouch
Thommoda Ar
Trapeang Kong
Tumpoar Meas
Voa Sa

Thpong District
Amleang
Monourom
Prambei Mom
Rung Roeang
Toap Mean
Veal Pon
Yea Angk

Kampong Thom Province

Baray District
Bak Sna
Balangk
Baray
Beung
Cheungdeung
Chroneang
Chhouk Ksach
Chong Dong
Chrolorng
Koki Thum
Krova
Andong Pou
Pongro
So Yourng
Srolao
Svay Phleung
Thnoat Chum
Treal

Kampong Svay District
Chey
Domrei Slab
Kampong Kou
Kampong Svay
Ni Pich
Phat Sanday
Sann Kor
Tbaeng
Trapeang Russei
Kdei Dong
Prey Kuy

Stueng Saen District

Domrei ChoanKhla
Kampong Thum
Kampong Roteah
Ou Konthor
Kampong Krabao
Prey Tahou
Achar Leak
Sroyouv

Prasat Balangk District
Daung
Kroya
Phann Nheum
Sakream
Salavisai
Samakki
Toul Kreul

Prasat Sambour District
Chouk
Kol
Sambo
Sroeung
TaingKrasao

Sandan District
Chheu Teal
Dorng Kambet
Klaeng
Mean Rith
Mean Chey
Gnorn
Sandaan
Suchitr
Tumrin

Santuk District
Beung Lvea
Chrorb
Kampong Thma
Kokoh
Kroya
Phnao
Brasat
Taing Krasaing
Ti Pou
Tbong Kropeu

Stoung District
Banteay Stoung
Chomna Krorm
Chomna Leu
Kampong Chen Cheung
Kampong Chen Tbong
Msa Krorng
Peam Bang
Popork
Brolay
Preah Domrei
Rong Reung
Somprouch
Trea

Kampot Province

Angkor Chey District
Angk Phnom Toch
Angkor Chey
Chompei
Dombok Khpous
Dankourm
Deum Dong
Mrourm
Phnom Kong
Brophnom
Somlanh
Tani

Banteay Meas District
Banteay Meas Khang Kert
Banteay Meas Khang Lech
Prey Tonle
Somrorng Krom
Somrorng Leu
Sdechkong Khang Cheung
Sdechkong Khang Lech
Sdechkong Khang Tbong
Tnoat Chong Srorng
Trapeang Sala Khang Kert
Trapeang Sala Khang Lech
Touk Meas Khang Kert
Touk Meas Khang Lech
Vat Angk Khang Cheung
Vat Angk Khang Tbong

Chhuk District
Baneav
Takaen
Beung Nimol
Chhouk
Daun Yoy
Krang Sbov
Krang Snay
Lbeuk
Trapeang Phlearng
Meanchey
Noreay
Satv Porng
Trapeang Bei
Tromaeng
Decho Aphivat

Chum Kiri District
Chres
Chompouvornt
Snay Anhchit
Srae Chaeng
Srae Khnong
Srae Somroang
Trapeang Reang

Dang Tong District
Domnak Sokrom
Dorng Tong
Kcheay Khang Cheung
Kcheay Khang Tbong
Meanrith
Sraechea Khang Cheung
Sraechea Khang Tbong
Totung
Angk Romeas
La'ang

Kampong Trach District
Beung Sala Khang Cheung
Beung Sala Khang Tbong
Domnak Kantout Khan Cheung
Domnak Kantout Khan Tbong
Kampong Trach Khang Kert
Kampong Trach Khang Lech
Brasat Phnom Kchorng
Phnom Brasat
Angk Sorphi
Praek Kreus
Russei Srok Khang Kert
Russei Srok Khang Lech
Svay Torng Khang Cheung
Svay Torng Khang Tbong

Tuek Chhou District
Beung Touk
Chum Kreal
Kampong Kraeng
Kampong Rorng
Kandoal
Koh Toch
Kon Sat
Makprang
Praek Tnoat
Prey Khmum
Prey Tnorng
Stueng Keo
Thmei
Trapeang Pring
Trapeang Sangke
Trapeang Thom

Kampot District
Kampong Kandal
Kampong Bay
Andoung Khmer
Traeuy Kaoh
Krang Ampil

Kandal Province

Kandal Stueng District
Ampov Prey
Anlong Romeat
Bar Kou
Beung Khchang
Cheung Keub
Deum Reus
Kandaok
Thmei
Koak Trob
Preah Puth
Praek Roka
Praek Slaeng
Roka
Roleang Kaen
Siem Reap
Tbaeng
Trapeang Vaeng
Trea

Kien Svay District
Banteay Daek
Chheu Teal
Dei Edh
Kampong Svay
Kokir
Kokir Thom
Phum Thom
Samroang Thom

Khsach Kandal District
Bak Dav
Chey Thom
Kampong Chomlorng
Koh Choram
Koh Ouhna Tei
Preah Brosob
Praek Ampel
Praek Loung
Praek Takov
Praek Tameak
Puk Russei
Roka Chonling
Sonlong
Sithor
Svay Chrum
Svay Romeat
Ta Aek
Vihear Sour

Koh Thum District
Chheu Khmao
Chroy Takeo
Kampong Kong
Koh Thom "K"
Koh Thom "Kh"
Leuk Daek
Pou Ban
Praek Chrey
Praek Thmei
Praek Sdei
Sampov Poun

Leuk Daek District
Kampong Phnom
Ka'om Samnor
Kpob Ateav
Peam Reang
Praek Dach
Praek Tonlob
Sandar

Lvea Aem District
Ariyaksatr
Barong
Beung Krum
Koh Keo
Koh Reah
Lvea Sor
Peam Okhna Ong
Phum Thom
Praek Kmeng
Praek Rey
Praek Russei
Sombour
Sarikakeo
Thma Kor
Teuk Khleang

Mukh Kamphool District
Preaek Anhchanh
Preaek Dambang
Rokakoang Ti Mouy
Rokakoang Ti Pir
Russei Chroay
Sambour Meas
Svay Ampear

Angk Snuol District
Baek Chan
Chhork Chheu Neang
Domnak Ampel
Krang Mkak
Lomhach
Mkak
Peuk
Prey Pouch
Somroang Leu
Toul Pich

Ponhea Leu District
Chhveang
Chrey Loas
Kampong Loung
Kampong Os
Koh Chen
Phnom Bat
Ponhea Leu
Praek Tataen
Psar Daek
Tomnub Thom
Vihear Loung

S'ang District
Khpob
Koh Anlong Chen
Koh Khel
Koh Ksach Tonlea
Krang Yov
Brasat
Praek Ambel
Praek Koay
Roka Kpos
S'ang Phnom
Setbo
Svay Broteal
Svay Rolum
Talon
Treuy Sla
Teuk Vel

Krong Ta Khmau
Ta Kdol
Praek Russei
Daeum Mien
Ta Khmau
Praek Hor
Kampong Somnah

Koh Kong Province

Botum Sakor District
Andong Teuk
Kandoal
Tanoun
Thma Sor

Kiri Sakor
Koh Sdech
Pnhi Meas
Praek Ksach

Koh Kong
Chroy Brors
Koh Kapi
Koh Sralao
Tatai Krom
Trapeang Rung

Khemara Phoumin
Smach Meanchey
Dorng Tung
Steung Vaeng

Mondol Seima
Pak Khlang
Peam Krosoab
Toul Koki

Srae Ambel
Beung Preav
Chi Kho Krom
Chi Kho Leu
Chroy Svay
Dorng Paeng
Srae Ambel

Thma Bang
Tatai Leu
Brolay
Chomnoab
Russei Chrum
Chiphat
Thma Daunpouv

Kratié Province

Chhlong District
Chhlong
Domrei Phong
Han Chey
Kampong Domrei
Kanhchor
Ksach Andaet
Praek Samann
Pongro

Chitr Borei District
Bos Leav
Changkrorng
Dar
Kantout
Kou Lorb
Koh Chraeng
Sambok
Thma Andeuk
Thma Krae
Thmei

Krong Kratie
Koh Trorng
Krokor
Kratie
Ou Russei
Roka Kandal

Preaek Prasob District
Chambok
Chroy Banteay
Kampong Kor
Koh Tasuy
Praek Brosop
Russei Keo
Soab
Tamao

Sombo District
Beung Char
Kampong Cham
Kbal Domrei
Koh Knhae
Ou Kreang
Rolous Meanchey
Sombo
Sandann
Srae Chis
Vadhnak

Snoul District
Khseum
Pir Thnou
Srae Char
Svay Chreas
Snoul

Mondulkiri Province

Kaev Seima District
Chong Phlas
Memorng
Sre Chhouk
Sre Khtum
Srae Preah

Kaoh Nheaek District
Nong Khileuk
Or Boun Leu
Ro Yor
Sokh Sant
Sre Huy
Sre Songkum

Ou Reang District
Dak Dam
Saen Monorom

Pech Chreada District
Krang Teh
Pou Chrey
Sre Ompoum
Bou Sra

Krong Saen Monorom
Monorom
Rum Monea
Sokh Dom
Spean Meanchey

Phnom Penh Capital

Khan Chamkar Mon
Tonle Bassac
Tuol Tumpoung I
Tuol Tumpoung II
Boeng Trabek
Phsar Daeum Thkov

Khan Daun Penh
Phsar Thmey I
Phsar Thmey II
Phsar Thmey III
Boeng Reang
Phsar Kandal I
Phsar Kandal II
Chaktomuk
Chey Chumneas
Phsar Chas
Srah Chak
Wat Phnom

Khan Prampir Makara
Orussey I
Orussey II
Orussey III
Orussey IV
Monorom
Mittapheap
Veal Vong
Boeung Prolit

Khan Tuol Kouk
Phsar Depo I
Phsar Depo II
Phsar Depo III
Toek L'ak I
Toek L'ak II
Toek L'ek III
Boeng Kak I
Boeng Kak II
Phsar Daeumkor
Boeng Salang

Khan Dangkao
Dangkao
Pong Tuek
Prey Vaeng
Prey Sor
Krang Pongro
Sak Sampov
Cheung Aek
Kong Noy
Praek Kampues
Roluos
Spean Thma
Tien

Khan Meanchey
Chak Angrae Leu
Chak Angrae Kroam
Stung Meanchey 1
Stung Meanchey 2
Stung Meanchey 3
Boeng Tompun 1
Boeng Tompun 2

Khan Russey Keo
Svay Pak
Kilometr Lek 6
Russey Keo
Chrang Chamreh 1
Chrang Chamreh 2
Tuol Sangkae 1
Tuol Sangkae 2

Khan Sen Sok
Phnom Penh Thmei
Tuek Thla
Khmuonh
Ou Baek K'am
Kouk Khleang

Khan Por Sen Chey
Trapeang Krasang
Samraong Kraom
Choam Chao 1
Choam Chao 2
Choam Chao 3
Kakab 1
Kakab 2
Krang Thnong

Khan Chrouy Changvar
Chrouy Changvar
Praek Leab
Praek Ta Sek
Kaoh Dach
Bak Kheng

Khan Prek Phnov
Praek Phnov
Ponhea Pon
Samraong
Kouk Roka
Ponsang

Khan Chbar Ampov
Chbar Ampov 1
Chbar Ampov 2
Nirouth
Praek Pra
Veal Sbov
Praek Aeng
Kbal Kaoh
Praek Thmei

Khan Boeng Keng Kang
Boeung Keng Kang 1
Boeung Keng Kang 2
Boeung Keng Kang 3
Olympic
Tomnub Tuek
Tuol Svay Prey 1
Tuol Svay Prey 2

Khan Kamboul
Kamboul
Kantaok
Ovlaok
Snaor
Phleung Chheh Roteh
Boeng Thum
Prateah Lang

Preah Vihear Province

Chey Saen
Sa'ang
Tor Sou
Kchorng
Chrach
Thmea
Putrea

Chhaeb
Chhaeb Mouy
Chhaeb Pir
Sangke Mouy
Sangke Pir
Mlouprey Mouy
Mlouprey Pir
Kampong Sralao Mouy
Kampong Sralao Pir

Choam Khsant
Choam Khsant
Sraem
Teuk Krahorm
Pring Thom
Romdoh Srae
Yeang
Kantout
Morodok

Kulen
Kulen Tbong
Kulen Cheung
Thmei
Phnom Penh
Phnom Tbeng Pir
Sroyong

Rovieng
Robeab
Reaksmey
Rohas
Rong Reung
Rik Reay
Rous Roan
Ratanak
Reab Roay
Reaksa
Romdors
Rumtum
Romniy

Krong Preah Vihear
Kampong Bronak
Pahal

Sangkom Thmei
Chomreun
Ro'ang
Phnom Tbeng Mouy
Sdao
Ranakseh

Tbaeng Mean Chey
Chhean Mukh
Pou
Bromeru
Preah Khleang

Prey Veng Province

Ba Phnum
Beung Preah
Cheung Phnum
Chheu Kach
Reaks Chey
Roang Domrei
Sdau Koang
Speu "K"
Speu "Kh"
Theay

Kamchay Mear
Cheach
Daun Keung
Kra Nhoung
Krabao
Seang Khveang
Smoang Khang Cheung
Smoang Khang Tbong
Trabaek

Kampong Trabaek
Ansoang
Cham
Cheang Daek
Chrey
Kamsoam Ork
Koa Khchork
Kampong Trabaek
Peam Montear
Brasat
Brotheat
Prey Chhor
Prey Poan
Thkov

Kanhchriech
Chong Ampil
Kanhchriech
Kdeung Reay
Koak Kung Kert
Koak Kung Lech
Preal
Thmar Poun
Tnoat

Me Sang
Angkor Sor
Chres
Chiphuch
Prey Khnes
Prey Romdeng
Prey Toteung
Svay Chrum
Trapeang Srae

Peam Chor
Angkor Angk
Kampong Brasat
Koh Chek
Koh Roka
Koh Sompov
Krang Tayorng
Praek Krabau
Russei Srok
Praek Sombour
Svay Phlous

Peam Ro
Baboang
Banlich Brasat
Neak Leung
Peam Meanchey
Pream Ro
Praek Ksay "K"
Praek Ksay "Kh"
Prey Kandieng

Pea Reang
Kampong Popel
Kanhchom
Kampong Braing
Mesar Brochan
Prey Phnov
Prey Sneat
Prey Srolet
Reab
Roka

Por Reang
Por Reang
Preak Anteah
Praek Chrey
Prey Kanloang
Takor
Kampong Russei
Praek Tasor

Preah Sdach
Angkor Reach
Banteay Chakrei
Beung Doal
Chey Kompork
Kampong Soeng
Krang Svay
Lvea
Preah Sdach
Reathor
Romchek
Sena Reach Udom

Prey Veaeng
Baray
Kampong Leav
Cheung Teuk

Sithor Kandalស្រុកស៊ីធរកណ្ដាល
Ampil Krau
Chrey Khmumឃុំ ជ្រៃឃ្មុំ
Lve
Phnov Ti Mouy
Phnov Ti Pur
Pou Ti
Praek Changkran
Prey Deum Thneung
Prey Teung
Romlech
Russei Sanh

Svay Antor
Angkor Tret
Chea Khlang
Chrey
Domrei Poun
Mebonn
Pean Roang
Popeus
Prey Khla
Somroang
Svay Antor
Teuk Thla

Pursat Province

Bakan
Beung Bot Kandal
Beung Khnar
Khnar Toteung
Meteuk
Or Tapoang
Romlech
Snam Preah
Svay Daunkeo
Talor
Trapeang Chorng

Kandieng
Anlong Vil
Kandieng
Kanhchor
Reang Til
Sre Sdok
Svay Loung
Sya
Veal
Koh Chum

Krakor
Anlong Tnoat
Anlong jan
Ansa Chambak
Beung Kantout
Chheu Tom
Kampong Loung
Kampong Por
Kbal Trach
Or Sandanh=
Sna Ansa
Svay Sor
Tnoat Chum

Phnum Kravanh
Bak Choncheanh
Leach
Pteah Rong
Prognel
Rokat
Santreae
Somrong

Krong Pursat
Chomreun Phal
Lolok Sor
Pteah Prey
Prey Nhi
Roleab
Svay Att
Banteay Dei

Veal Veng
Or Sorm
Kropeu 2
Anlong Reab
Bromoay
Thma Da

Ratanakiri Province

Andoung Meas
Nalik
Nhang
Talav

Krong Banlung
Kachanh
Labanseik
Yeakh Loam
Beung Kanseng

Bar Kaev
Kork
Keh Chong
Laminh
Ting Chak

Koun Mom
Serei Mongkol
Sre Angkrorng
Ta Orng
Teun
Trapeang Chres
Trapeang Krahorm

Lumphat
Chey Udom
Kaleng
Lbang 1
Lbang 2
Batang
Seda

Ou Chum
Cha Uong
Poy
Aekkapheap
Kalei
Ou CHum
Sammaki
Laork

Ou Ya Dav
Bar Kham
Lun Choar
Pork Nhai
Pate
Sesan
Soam Thum
Yatung

Ta Veaeng
Ta Veang Leu
Ta Veang Kroam

Veun Sai
Pong
Hat Pork
Ka Chon
Koh Pong
Koh Peak
Kok Lak
Pakalanh
Phnom Kok
Veun Sai

Siem Reap Province

Angkor Chum
Char Chhouk
Daun Peng
Koak Daung
Koal
Nokor Pheas
Srae Khvav
Tasoam

Angkor Thom
Chub Tatrav
Leang Dai
Peak Snaeng
Svay Chek

Banteay Srei
Khnar Sanday
Khun Ream
Preak Dak
Romchek
Run Ta Aek
Tbaeng

Chi Kraeng
Anlong Samnor
Chi Kraeng
Kampong Kdei
Khvav
Koak Thlok Krom
Koak Thlok Leu
Lveng Russei
Pongro Krom
Pongro Leu
Russei Lok
Songveuy
Spean Tnoat

Kralanh
Chonleas Dai
Kampong Thkov
Kralanh
Krouch Kor
Roang Koar
Sambour
Sen Sok
Snoul
Sronal
Ta An

Puok
Sosor Sdom
Daun Keo
Kdei Run
Keo Por
Khnat
Lvea
Mukh Paen
Pou Treay
Pouk
Prey Chrouk
Reul
Somroang Yea
Treu Nhoar
Yeang

Prasat Bakong
Bakong
Balangk
Kampong Phluk
Kantreang
Kandaek
Meanchey
Rolous
Trapeang Thom

Siem Reap
Slor Kram
Svay Dongkum
Kouk Chauk
Sala Komreuk
Nokor Thom
Chreav
Chong Khneas
Sambour
Seam Reap
Sragnae
Ampil
Krabei Real
Teuk Vil

Sout Nikom
Chan Sor
Dom Daek
Danrun
Kampong Khleang
Kean Sangke
Khchas
Khnar Pou
Popel
Samroang
Ta Yaek

Srei Snam
Chroy Neang Ngoun
Klang Hay
Tram Sosor
Moang
Brey
Slaeng Spean

Svay Leu
Beung Mealea
Kantout
Khnorng Phnum
Svay Leu
Ta Seam

Varin
Brasat
Lvea Krang
Srae Noy
Svay Sor
Varin

Preah Sihanouk Province

Krong Preah Sihanouk
Sangkat 1
Sangkat 2
Sangkat 3
Sangkat 4
Koh Rong

Steung Hav
Kompenh
Ou Treh
Tomnob Rolork
Keo Phos

Prey Nob
Andong Thmar
Beung Taprum
Bet Trang
Cheung Koar
Ou Chrov
Ou Oknha Heng
Prey Nob
Ream
Sammaki
Somrong
Teuk Laork
Teuk Tla
Toul Toteung
Veal Rinh

Kampong Seila
Chomkar Loung
Kampong Seila
Ou Bak Roteh
Steung Chhay

Stung Treng Province

Sesan
Komphun
Kbal Romeas
Phluk
Sam Khouy
Sdau
Srae Kor
Ta Lat

Siem Bouk
Koh Preah
Koh Sompeay
Koh Srolay
Ou Mreah
Ou Russei Kandal
Siem Bouk
Srae Krasang

Siem Pang
Praek Meas
Sekong
Santipheap
Srae Sombo
Thma Keo

Krong Stung Treng
Stung Trang
Srah Russei
Preah Bat
Sammaki

Thala Barivat
Anlong Phe
Chomkar Leu
Kang Cham
Koh Snaeng
Anlong Chrey
Ou Rai
Ou Svay
Preah Romkel
Som Ang
Srae Russei
Thala Borivat

Svay Rieng Province

Chantrea
Chantrea
Chres
Mesar Thgnork
Prey Kokir
Somroang
Toul Sdei

Kampong Rou
Banteay Krang
Nhor
Ksetr
Preah Ponlea
Chrey Thom
Reach Monti
Somlei
Somyorng
Svay Tayean
Thmei
Tnaot

Rumduol
Bos Mon
Thmea
Kampong Chork
Chrong Popel
Kampong Ampel
Meun Chey
Porng Teuk
Sangke
Svay Chek
Thna Thnung

Romeas Haek
Ampel
Andong Pou
Andong Trabaek
Angk Brosrae
Chnatrei
Chrey Thom
Daung
Kampong Trach
Kokir
Krasang
Mukh Da
Mream
Sambour
Sambatt Meanchey
Trapeang Sdao
Trors

Svay Chrum
Angk Taso
Bassak
Chombok
Kampong Chomlong
Tasous
Chheu Teal
Daun Sor
Kork Pring
Krol Kor
Krous
Pou Reach
Svay Angk
Svay Chrum
Svay Thom
Svay Yea
Thlork

Krong Svay Rieng
Svay Rieng
Prey Chhlak
Kory Trobaek
Pou Tahor
Chek
Svay Teu
Sangkhor

Svay Teab
Kokir Soam
Kandiang Reay
Monorom
Popaet
Prey Ta Ei
Brosotr
Romeang Tkorl
Sambour
Svay Rompear

Krong Bavet
Bati
Bavet
Chrak Mtes
Prasat
Prey Angkunh

Takeo Province

Angkor Borei District
Angkor Borei Commune
Ba Srae Commune
Kouk Thlok Commune
Ponley Commune
Prek Phtoul Commune (Preaek Phtoul)
Prey Phkoam Commune

Bati District
Chambak Commune
Champei Commune
Doung Commune
Kandoeng Commune
Komar Reachea Commune
Krang Leav Commune
Krang Thnong Commune
Lumpong Commune
Pea Ream Commune
Pot Sar Commune
Sour Phi Commune
Tang Doung Commune
Tnaot Commune
Trapeang Krasang Commune
Trapeang Sab Commune

Bourei Cholsar District
Bourei Cholsar Commune
Chey Chouk Commune
Doung Khpos Commune
Kampong Krasang Commune
Kouk Pou Commune

Kiri Vong District
Angk Prasat Commune
Preah Bat Choan Chum Commune
Kamnab Commune
Kampeaeng Commune (Kiri Vong District)
Kiri Chong Kaoh Commune
Kouk Prech Commune
Phnum Den Commune
Prey Ampok Commune
Prey Rumdeng Commune (Kiri Vong District)
Ream Andaeuk Commune
Saom Commune
Ta Our Commune

Kaoh Andaet District
Krapum Chhuk Commune
Pech Sar Commune
Prey Khla
Prey Yuthka Commune
Romenh Commune
Thlea Prachum Commune

Prey Kabbas District
Angkanh Commune
Ban Kam Commune
Champa Commune
Char Commune
Kompaeng Commune
Kompong Reab Commune
Kdanh Commune
Pou Rumchak Commune
Prey Kabbas Commune
Prey Lvea Commune
Prey Phdau Commune
Snao Commune
Tang Yab Commune

Samraong District
 Boeng Tranh Khang Cheung Commune
 Boeng Tranh Khang Tboung Commune
 Cheung Kuon Commune
 Chumreah Pen Commune
 Khvav Commune
 Lumchang Commune
 Rovieng Commune
 Samraong Commune
 Sla Commune
 Soengh Commune
 Trea Commune

Krong Doun Kaev
Sangkat Baray
Sangkat Roka Knong
Sangkat Roka Krau

Tram Kak District
 Angk Ta Saom Commune
 Cheang Tong Commune
 Kus Commune
 Leay Bour Commune
 Nhaeng Nhang Commune
 Otdam Soriya Commune
 Our Saray Commune
 Popel Commune
 Samraong Commune
 Srae Ronoung Commune
 Ta Phem Commune
 Tram Kak Commune
 Trapeang Kranhung Commune
 Trapeang Thum Khang Cheung Commune
 Trapeang Thum Khang Tboung Commune

Treang District
Angkanh Commune
Angk Khnor Commune
Chi Khma Commune
Khvav Commune
Prambei Mum Commune
Angk Kev Commune
Prey Sloek Commune
Sambuor Commune
Sanlong Commune
Smaong Commune
Srangae Commune
Thlok Commune
Tralach Commune
Roneam Commune

Oddar Meanchey Province

Anlong Veaeng
Anlong Veaeng
Trapeang Tav
Trapeang Prei
Thlat
Lomtorng

Banteay Ampil
Ampil
Beng
Koak Kpous
Koak Mon

Chong Kal
Cheung Tean
Krasaing
Pongro

Krong Samraong
Bansay Reak
Bosbov
Kaun Kreal
Samroang
O Smach

Trapeang Prasat
Bak Anlung
P'av
Ou Svay
Preah Brolay
Tomnub Dach
Trapeang Brasat

Kep Province

Krong Keb
Keb
Prey Thom

Damnak Chang'Eur
Angkoal
Porng Teuk

Pailin Province

Pailin
Pailin
Ou Tavao
Toul Lvea
Bar Yakha

Sala Krao
Sala Krao
Steung Trorng
Steung Kach
Ou Andong

Tboung Khmum Province

Dombae
Chong Cheach
Dombee
Kork Srok
Neang Teut
Seda
Teuk Chrov
Trapeang Pring

Krouch Chhma
Chhouk
Chomnik
Kampong Treas
Koh Pir
Kroch Chhma
Peus 1
Peus 2
Prek Achi
Roka Khnor
Svay Khleang
Trea
Toul Snoul

Memot
Chan Moul
Choam
Choam Krovean
Choam Tamao
Dar
Kompoan
Memorng
Memot
Roung
Romchek
Tromoung
Tonloung
Treak
Kokir

Ou Reang Ov
Ampil Tapork
Chork
Domrel
Kong Chey
Mean
Preah Theat
Toul Sophi

Ponhea Kraek
Dauntei
Kork
Kondoal Chrum*
Koangkang
Kraek
Popel
Trapeang Phlong
Veal Mlu

Tboung Khmum
Ancheum
Beung Proul
Chikor
Chiror 1
Chiror 2
Chub
Kor
Lgnieng
Mong Reav
Peam Chileang
Roka Por Bram
Srolob
Thmar Pich
Tonle Bet

Krong Suong
Suong
Vihear Loung

References

 
Subdivisions of Cambodia
Lists of subdivisions of Cambodia
Cambodia 3
Communes, Cambodia